Real value may refer to:

Real versus nominal value: real values are the actual values of something while nominal values are the stated values of something
Real versus nominal value (economics): nominal values are the face value of currency over long periods of time (years), whereas real values have been corrected for
A mathematical value that is a real number